The Missouri Circuit Courts are the state trial courts of original jurisdiction and general jurisdiction of the state of Missouri.

Jurisdiction
The Missouri Constitution provides for the Circuit Courts in Article V, Judicial Department.

List of circuits
There are 46 judicial circuits, each with various divisions, including associate circuit, small claims, municipal, family, probate, criminal, and juvenile. Each circuit covers at least one of Missouri's 114 counties and one independent city, St. Louis.

1st Judicial Circuit – Clark County, Schuyler County, Scotland County
2nd Judicial Circuit – Adair County, Knox County, Lewis County
3rd Judicial Circuit – Grundy County, Harrison County, Mercer County, Putnam County
4th Judicial Circuit – Atchison County, Gentry County, Holt County, Nodaway County, Worth County
5th Judicial Circuit – Andrew County, Buchanan County
6th Judicial Circuit – Platte County
7th Judicial Circuit – Clay County
8th Judicial Circuit – Carroll County, Ray County
9th Judicial Circuit – Chariton County, Linn County, Sullivan County
10th Judicial Circuit – Marion County, Monroe County, Ralls County
11th Judicial Circuit – St. Charles County
12th Judicial Circuit – Audrain County, Montgomery County, Warren County
13th Judicial Circuit – Boone County, Callaway County
14th Judicial Circuit – Howard County, Randolph County
15th Judicial Circuit – Lafayette County, Saline County
16th Judicial Circuit – Jackson County
17th Judicial Circuit – Cass County, Johnson County
18th Judicial Circuit – Cooper County, Pettis County
19th Judicial Circuit – Cole County
20th Judicial Circuit – Franklin County, Gasconade County, Osage County
21st Judicial Circuit – St. Louis County
22nd Judicial Circuit – City of St. Louis
23rd Judicial Circuit – Jefferson County
24th Judicial Circuit – Madison County, Sainte Genevieve County, Saint Francois County, Washington County
25th Judicial Circuit – Maries County, Phelps County, Pulaski County, Texas County
26th Judicial Circuit – Camden County, Laclede County, Miller County, Moniteau County, Morgan County
27th Judicial Circuit – Bates County, Henry County, St. Clair County
28th Judicial Circuit – Barton County, Cedar County, Dade County, Vernon County
29th Judicial Circuit – Jasper County
30th Judicial Circuit – Benton County, Dallas County, Hickory County, Polk County, Webster County
31st Judicial Circuit – Greene County
32nd Judicial Circuit – Bollinger County, Cape Girardeau County, Perry County
33rd Judicial Circuit – Mississippi County, Scott County
34th Judicial Circuit – New Madrid County, Pemiscot County
35th Judicial Circuit – Dunklin County, Stoddard County
36th Judicial Circuit – Butler County, Ripley County
37th Judicial Circuit – Carter County, Howell County, Oregon County, Shannon County
38th Judicial Circuit – Christian County
39th Judicial Circuit – Barry County, Lawrence County, Stone County
40th Judicial Circuit – McDonald County, Newton County
41st Judicial Circuit – Macon County, Shelby County
42nd Judicial Circuit – Crawford County, Dent County, Iron County, Reynolds County, Wayne County
43rd Judicial Circuit – Caldwell County, Clinton County, Daviess County, DeKalb County, Livingston County
44th Judicial Circuit – Douglas County, Ozark County, Wright County
45th Judicial Circuit – Lincoln County, Pike County
46th Judicial Circuit – Taney County

References

External links
List of Circuit Courts from the Missouri state judiciary official website

Missouri
Missouri state courts
Courts and tribunals with year of establishment missing